The Distinguished Marksmanship Ribbon was a United States Navy military award which was established in 1942 as the Distinguished Marksman and Pistol Shot Ribbon. The ribbon recognized those who had been presented a Distinguished Marksman Badge through exceptional scoring at a professional military shooting competition.  The Distinguished Marksman and Pistol Shot Ribbon was issued for receipt of either a Rifle or Pistol Distinguished Marksman Badge.

In 1952, the Secretary of the Navy ordered that the Distinguished Marksman and Pistol Shot Ribbon be divided into two new awards: the Distinguished Marksman Ribbon, to denote distinguished marksmanship with a rifle, and the Distinguished Pistol Shot Ribbon, to denote distinguished marksmanship with a pistol. The Distinguished Marksman Ribbon and Distinguished Pistol Shot Ribbon were discontinued by the Navy Department in 1960.

Even though all three of the Distinguished Marksmanship Ribbons have been declared obsolete, the Distinguished Marksman (rifle) and Distinguished Pistol Shot Badges have always been authorized for wear by those who have earned them. The ribbons were worn if the badge was not worn. Under current uniform regulations, the Navy's Marksmanship Competition Badges are worn when large medals or service ribbons are prescribed.

See also
Marksmanship Ribbon
Marksmanship Device
Marksmanship Badge (United States)
Awards and decorations of the United States military

References

Awards and decorations of the United States Navy
Awards established in 1942
Awards established in 1952
Military ribbons of the United States
1942 establishments in the United States